Aleksandra Prokopyeva (born 24 July 1994) is a Russian alpine ski racer.

She competed in the FIS Alpine World Ski Championships 2017 – Women's Downhill with a time of 1:35.46 28.

Aleksandra uses a Redster S9 FIS M slalom racer.

References

1994 births
Living people
Russian female alpine skiers
Place of birth missing (living people)
Competitors at the 2015 Winter Universiade